"Leave a Tender Moment Alone" is a song performed by Billy Joel and the fifth single from his album An Innocent Man. Toots Thielemans makes a guest appearance on harmonica. The song reached number 27 on the U.S. Billboard Hot 100 charts and spent two weeks at number one on the Adult Contemporary chart.

"Leave a Tender Moment Alone" was the only single from the album released there not to reach the top 20 of the chart, and, along with the title track, was the second single not to have a video made for it.

Reception
Cash Box called the song "a tender country-tinged cut that is highlighted by the veteran songster’s effortless vocalizing."

Track listing

7" single
"Leave a Tender Moment Alone"
"This Night" (US B-side)
"Goodnight Saigon" (UK B-side)

A 'special souvenir 5 track 12 inch' vinyl was also available.

Chart positions

See also
List of number-one adult contemporary singles of 1984 (U.S.)

References

1984 singles
Billy Joel songs
Songs written by Billy Joel
Song recordings produced by Phil Ramone
Columbia Records singles
1983 songs